The 2018–19 Denmark Series was the 54th season of the Denmark Series which is a Danish football competition featuring amateur clubs. It is the fourth tier of the Danish football league system. The competition is divided in four groups of ten teams each, based on geographical location. The winner of each group will be promoted to the 2019–20 Danish 2nd Divisions. Relegation from the Denmark Series is wholly dependent on clubs relegating from the Danish 2nd Division; again, based on their geographical location. 

Because four clubs from west of the Great Belt relegated from the 2018–19 Danish 2nd Divisions, and no teams east of the Great Belt, the 8th, 9th and 10th places of the West Groups (3 & 4) faced direct relegation to the lower tiers. The two 7th places in the East Groups (1 & 2) therefore face each other in direct play-off match for a place in the Denmark Series on a neutral ground. The overall winner remains in the Denmark Series.

East Groups 
No clubs from the East Groups relegated directly to the lower tiers, as four clubs west of the Great Belt relegated from the 2018–19 Danish 2nd Divisions (Odder IGF, Tarup-Paarup IF, Kjellerup IF and BK Marienlyst).  Kastrup Boldklub became to only East Group club to relegate after a 3–0 loss to Taastrup FC in a direct play-off match for a place in the 2019–20 Denmark Series. 

TFC Odsherred disbanded following the season, saving Kastrup Boldklub from direct relegation.

Group 1

Group 2

West Groups
Six clubs relegated directly from the Denmark Series from the West Groups, as four clubs west of the Great Belt relegated from the 2018–19 Danish 2nd Divisions (Odder IGF, Tarup-Paarup IF, Kjellerup IF and BK Marienlyst).

Group 3

Group 4

Relegation play-offs
There was no playoff match in the West Groups (Groups 3 & 4) because Skovshoved IF (east of the Great Belt) survived in the Danish 2nd Division and four west clubs relegated from the Danish 2nd Division.

East Region
The East Region (Groups 1 & 2) relegation play-off was played on 23 June 2019 at the Glostrup Stadion. The "home" team (for administrative purposes) was Taastrup FC.

References

3
2018–19 in European fourth tier association football leagues
Denmark Series seasons